James Timothy Pratt (December 14, 1802 – April 11, 1887) was a U.S. Representative from Connecticut.

Born in Cromwell, Connecticut, Pratt attended the common schools.
He engaged in mercantile and agricultural pursuits in Hartford, Connecticut.

Enlisted in the "Horse Guard" in 1820. He served as mayor 1826–29. Pratt was elected major of the First Regiment of Cavalry in 1834. He served as colonel in 1836, brigadier general 1837–39 and a major general 1839–46.

Pratt then served as adjutant general in 1846, retiring from mercantile pursuits and settled in Rocky Hill, Connecticut.

He served as member of the Connecticut House of Representatives in 1847, 1848, and 1850. The a member of the Connecticut Senate in 1852.
He served as President pro tempore of the Connecticut Senate.

He was again a member of the State house of representatives in 1857 and 1862.

Pratt was elected as a Democrat to the Thirty-third Congress (March 4, 1853 – March 3, 1855).

He was an unsuccessful candidate for reelection in 1854 to the Thirty-fourth Congress. Pratt was an unsuccessful candidate for election as governor in 1858 and 1859.

Pratt served as member of the peace convention of 1861 held in Washington, D.C., in an effort to devise means to prevent the impending war.

During the American Civil War, Pratt was a War Democrat.

Pratt was again a member of the State house of representatives in 1870 and 1871.

He engaged in agricultural pursuits.

Pratt died in Wethersfield, Connecticut, April 11, 1887, and was interred in Indian Hill Cemetery, Middletown, Connecticut.

References

External links

1802 births
1887 deaths
Burials at Indian Hill Cemetery
United States Army generals
Connecticut Adjutant Generals
Democratic Party Connecticut state senators
Presidents pro tempore of the Connecticut Senate
Democratic Party members of the Connecticut House of Representatives
Mayors of places in Connecticut
Military personnel from Connecticut
Democratic Party members of the United States House of Representatives from Connecticut
19th-century American politicians
People from Cromwell, Connecticut
People from Rocky Hill, Connecticut